The 1984–85 Illinois State Redbirds men's basketball team represented Illinois State University during the 1984–85 NCAA Division I men's basketball season. The Redbirds, led by seventh year head coach Bob Donewald, played their home games at Horton Field House and were a member of the Missouri Valley Conference.

The Redbirds finished the season 22–8, 11–5 in conference play to finish in a tie for second place. They were the number two seed for the Missouri Valley Conference tournament by virtue of sweeping the season series over Wichita State University. They were defeated in a quarterfinal game to Indiana State University.

The Redbirds received an at-large bid to the 1985 NCAA Division I men's basketball tournament. They were assigned to the Midwest Regional as the number nine seed where they defeated the University of Southern California in the first round and lost to the University of Oklahoma in the second round.

Roster

Schedule

|-
!colspan=9 style=|Exhibition Season

|-
!colspan=9 style=|Regular Season

|-
!colspan=9 style=|Missouri Valley Conference {MVC} tournament

|-
!colspan=9 style=|National Collegiate Athletic Association {NCAA} tournament

References

Illinois State Redbirds men's basketball seasons
Illinois State
Illinois State